Charles Joseph Ritter   (October 1868 – December 13, 1958) was a Major League Baseball player.

Born in 1868 at Buffalo, New York, he played for the 1885 Buffalo Bisons. He replaced Buffalo's regular second baseman Hardy Richardson in late September 1885 when Buffalo sold its "Big Four" infield to the Detroit Wolverines. In two major-league games, Ritter had one hit in six at bats and struck out twice. He played 17 innings at second base with eight putouts, five assists, three errors, and one double play in 16 chances. 

After his professional baseball career, Ritter worked as a payroll teller for the Manufacturers & Traders Trust Co. from 1916 to 1932. He then went into the automobile business, as the owner and operator of Westcott Motors Inc. He moved to Florida in 1954. Ritter died in 1958 in Fort Myers, Florida. He was the final surviving member of the Buffalo Bisons.

References

External links

1868 births
1958 deaths
Major League Baseball second basemen
Buffalo Bisons (NL) players
19th-century baseball players
Baseball players from Buffalo, New York